This article is about the particular significance of the year 1712 to Wales and its people.

Incumbents
Lord Lieutenant of North Wales (Lord Lieutenant of Anglesey, Caernarvonshire, Denbighshire, Flintshire, Merionethshire, Montgomeryshire) – Hugh Cholmondeley, 1st Earl of Cholmondeley
Lord Lieutenant of South Wales (Lord Lieutenant of Glamorgan, Brecknockshire, Cardiganshire, Carmarthenshire, Monmouthshire, Pembrokeshire, Radnorshire) – Thomas Herbert, 8th Earl of Pembroke

Bishop of Bangor – John Evans
Bishop of Llandaff – John Tyler
Bishop of St Asaph – William Fleetwood
Bishop of St Davids – Philip Bisse

Events
1 January
Thomas Mansel, 5th Baronet, becomes 1st Baron Mansel.
Thomas Trevor is raised to the peerage as 1st Baron Trevor of Bromham.
Thomas Windsor, son of the Earl of Plymouth, is created Baron Mountjoy. Windsor, the second husband of Charlotte Jeffreys, daughter of Philip Herbert, 7th Earl of Pembroke, would sell much of his family's Welsh property, but their Glamorgan estates would pass through the marriage of a descendant, Charlotte Hickman-Windsor, to John Stuart, 1st Marquess of Bute. 
July - On the death of its Principal Jonathan Edwards, Jesus College, Oxford, inherits his extensive library. Edwards is buried in the college chapel, whose restoration is funded by another bequest in his will. 
August - Jonathan Edwards is replaced as Principal of Jesus by John Wynne, who has the support of the college Visitor, the Earl of Pembroke.
October - Erasmus Lewis is appointed "provost-marshall-general in the Barbadoes".

Arts and literature

New books
The series of Welsh Almanacks printed by Thomas Jones is completed. (Jones dies the following year.)
Robert Nelson - Cydymaith i Ddyddiau Gwylion ac Ymprydiau Eglwys Loegr (translation by Thomas Williams of A Companion for the Festivals and Fasts of the Church of England)

Births
January - David Owen, harpist (died 1741)

Deaths
20 July - Jonathan Edwards, theologian and academic, 83
12 September - Sir Thomas Williams, 1st Baronet, about 90
20 November - Humphrey Humphreys, bishop, 63
date unknown - Nicholas Bagenal, MP for Anglesey, about 83

See also
1712 in Scotland

References

1710s in Wales
Years of the 18th century in Wales